Orlando Max Malone (born December 18, 1963), is an American former professional boxer who competed from 1992 to 2007. He challenged for the WBO mini flyweight title in 1993.

Professional career 
Malone started boxing at the age of 21. After an amateur career which included winning an area title at the US Amateur Boxing Championships in 1991 and the Class A 106-pound title in the Colorado Golden Gloves tournament in 1992, he had his first professional fight in August 1992.

Professional boxing record

External links

References

1963 births
Living people
American male boxers
Bantamweight boxers